Sture Frölén (13 May 1907 – 27 December 1999) was a Swedish architect. His work was part of the architecture event in the art competition at the 1948 Summer Olympics. In his extensive work, he later designed buildings of various kinds, such as sports facilities, industries, town halls, schools and churches.

References

1907 births
1999 deaths
20th-century Swedish architects
Olympic competitors in art competitions
Artists from Stockholm